Comedy Big League is a South Korean comedy show presented by Shin Young-il and Bae Ji-hyun. It airs on tvN on Sundays at 19:45(KST).

Seasons
Season 1 (September 17, 2011 - November 19, 2011)
Season 2 (December 24, 2011 - March 31, 2012)
Season 3 (May 12, 2012 - August 18, 2012)
Season 4 (September 29, 2012 - August 17, 2013)
Season 5 (September 29, 2013 – present)

Famous Comedians
Park Na-rae
Lee Guk-joo
Lee Yong-jin
Lee Jin-ho
Lee Sang-jun
Moon Se-yoon
Yang Se-hyung
Yang Se-chan
Yoo Sang-moo
Jang Dong-min
Jang Do-yeon
Jo Se-ho

Awards and nominations

References

External links
  

2011 South Korean television series debuts
2020s South Korean television series
Korean-language television shows
South Korean television sketch shows
South Korean variety television shows
TVN (South Korean TV channel) original programming